Éric Forest (born April 6, 1952) is a Canadian Senator from Quebec. He was previously Mayor of Rimouski, Quebec from 2005 to 2016 and had been president of the l'Union des municipalités québécoises from 2011 to 2014.

Career 
From 1995 to 2006, he was the first president of the Rimouski Océanic. a junior ice hockey team in the Quebec Major Junior Hockey League.

Forest was first elected to office, at the age of 27, as a councillor in Pointe-au-Père, Quebec, becoming mayor two years later. He then entered private life becoming the co-owner of a car dealership before returning to politics in 1994 as a city councillor in Rimouski.

In 2014, he received the Jean-Paul L'Allier Award, which honours a Quebec elected official for outstanding vision, leadership and achievements in urban planning and land-use planning.

He considered running as a Liberal candidate in the 2014 Quebec provincial election, but eventually decided to complete his term as mayor.

References

External links
 

Living people
1952 births
Canadian senators from Quebec
Independent Canadian senators
Mayors of Rimouski
21st-century Canadian politicians
Independent Senators Group